Live – På ren svenska is the second live album, and the fourteenth album overall, by the Swedish hard rock band Jerusalem, released in 1999. It was Jerusalem's first Swedish-only album. It was recorded on the 1997 "Korståget" tour in Scandinavia, the first tour with this line-up since 1981.

Track listing
All songs by Ulf Christiansson, except for "Dagarna går" by Dan Tibell.

Disc one
 "Introduktion"
 "Du kommer först"
 "Mossberg... hej... hej"
 "Så va' de' då"
 "Krigsman"
 "It's mad"
 "Dagarna går"
 "Var du än är"
 "Pappa vem har gjort"
 "Jag längtar efter mer av dej"
 "Hög tid"
 "Sodom"
Track 1 from Volym 2
Tracks 2, 4 & 8 from Volym Tre
Tracks 5, 6 & 12 from Krigsman
Tracks 7, 9 & 11 from Jerusalem
Track 10 previously unreleased

Disc two
 "Moderne man"
 "Neutral"
 "Jag vill ge dig en blomma"
 "Uffes story..."
 "Vänd om"
 "Flugit genom rymden"
 Trumdrag ifrån Klas
 "Ständig förändring"
 "Noa"
 "Ajöss med dej värld"
 "Kom till mej"

Tracks 1 & 8 from Krigsman
Tracks 2, 9 & 11 from Jerusalem
Track 3 & 10 from Volym 2
Track 5 from Volüm Fyra
Track 6 from Volym Tre''

Personnel 

 Ulf Christiansson - lead vocals, guitar
 Anders Mossberg - bass guitar, vocals
 Dan Tibell - keyboards
 Klas Anderhell - drums, vocals

References

1999 live albums
Jerusalem (Swedish band) albums